Kis-My-1st is an album by Japanese  boy group Kis-My-Ft2. The album has spawned three singles.

Promotions 
The album's promotional tour ran between March 31 and June 3, 2012.

Other editions 
Along with the regular edition (CD only), Avex Trax have also released three other editions: the limited edition (CD + DVD, the second limited edition (CD + Special CD Kis-My-Zero), and the Kis-My-Ft2 SHOP limited edition ((CD + Privilege).

Track listing

Charts

Singles chart

References

2012 debut albums
Avex Group albums
Japanese-language albums